Father Anne, born Anne Tropeano, is a self-proclaimed Roman Catholic priest ordained through the womanpriest movement. Upon her ordination, Father Anne was excommunicated from the Catholic Church.

Call to the priesthood 
Father Anne was born in Massachusetts and resides in New Mexico. She earned a Master's degree in Divinity from the Jesuit School of Theology in Berkeley, California. Before becoming a Roman Catholic priest, Father Anne had a varied background working in nonprofits and small business administration. She studied marketing and promotions and earned a Master's degree in Rhetoric and Writing Studies from San Diego State University. She managed an independent touring band for five years. Father Anne received Catholic sacraments when she was a child but she only began to be an active Catholic in her late 20s.

Ordination through the womanpriest movement 

Catholic women have been fighting for the ordination of women since at least the 1960s. Father Anne's work is part of this tradition as she works within the womanpriest movement. She was ordained in her home state of New Mexico at the Cathedral of St. John in Albuquerque, an Episcopal church, in October 2021.

Father Anne is celibate and wears the Roman collar of a Catholic priest. She has said God called her to the priesthood, offering, "God is asking me to do this and so it came down to either being obedient to the church teaching or being obedient to God, and we all know the church has changed its teachings over time on other issues." In 2020, Father Anne was a recipient of the Lucile Murray Durkin Scholarship, named after a visionary Catholic activist.

The Catholic News Agency reported promptly on her "supposed ordination" and her "simulated Mass" at St. Paul Lutheran Church in Albuquerque the following day. Glennon Jones, the vicar general of the Archdiocese of Santa Fe, confirmed the church's opposition to the ordination of women.

According to National Catholic Reporter, there are about 250 Catholic women priests around the world. Many of these women were ordained through the womanpriest movement. Pope Francis has maintained the position the Roman Catholic priesthood will remained closed to women.

BBC documentary 
In December 2022, the BBC World Service published a documentary about Father Anne titled "The Women Fighting to Be Priests" which included film of her ordination. After the release of the BBC documentary, Father Anne called upon Pope Francis to meet with women who want to be recognized as Roman Catholic priests.

#FatherAnneinTheVan 
Father Anne plans to tour the United States extensively throughout 2023 to raise awareness about the need for women's ordination. She has publicly shared she will use the hashtag #FatherAnneInTheVan in 2023.

Ministry to the LGBTQ community 
Father Anne is an open supporter of LGBTQ Catholics and has been quoted as saying, "I especially want to minister to the LGBTQ community." In June 2022, Father Anne marched in the Albuquerque pride parade.

See also 

 Mary Daly
 Elizabeth Farians
 Maureen Fiedler
 Mary Hunt
 Donna Quinn
 Margaret Traxler
 Marjorie Tuite
 New Ways Ministry
 Ordination of Women
 Ordination of Women in the Catholic Church

References 

Catholic feminists
Catholics from New Mexico
Women's ordination activists
People excommunicated by the Catholic Church
Living people
Year of birth missing (living people)
Jesuit School of Theology at Berkeley alumni
Catholics